The Poet and the Tsar is a 1927 Soviet silent biopic film directed by Vladimir Gardin and Yevgeni Chervyakov.

Plot
Tsar Nikolai I is infatuated with Natalia Goncharova, wife of Alexander Pushkin. Trying to hide his passion, the tsar helps Natalia get closer with officer d'Anthès. The whole royal court gossips about the relationship of Natalia with d'Anthès. These rumors reach Pushkin and he challenges d'Anthès to a duel ...

Cast

References

Bibliography 
 Christie, Ian & Taylor, Richard. The Film Factory: Russian and Soviet Cinema in Documents 1896-1939. Routledge, 2012.

External links 
 

1920s historical films
Soviet historical films
1920s biographical films
Soviet biographical films
Soviet silent feature films
1920s Russian-language films
Films directed by Vladimir Gardin
Films directed by Yevgeni Chervyakov
Soviet black-and-white films
Films set in the 19th century
Films set in the Russian Empire
Cultural depictions of Nicholas I of Russia